Delta Xi Phi is a national multicultural sorority that was founded at the University of Illinois at Urbana-Champaign by fifteen women on April 20, 1994.  The sorority welcomes women from all ethnic, cultural, religious, and socio-economic backgrounds. Defined by diversity, Delta Xi Phi is not only multicultural in membership but also in programming since its inception. Delta Xi Phi is one of the founding members of the National Multicultural Greek Council (NMGC).

Delta Xi Phi is based on five pillars: the Advancement of Women through Higher Education, Community Service, Increasing Multicultural Awareness, Sisterhood, and Friendship.

National history
Delta Xi Phi sorority was founded on April 20, 1994, on the University of Illinois at Urbana – Champaign (UIUC) campus, by fifteen young women. They recognized a need for an organization that appreciated the different cultures present on their college campuses. Multicultural awareness, as well as community service, empowerment of women in higher education, friendship, and sisterhood were also important aspects of Delta Xi Phi.

In the spring of 1992, two different groups of women who were seeking to establish a new sorority at UIUC learned of each other's intentions. The two groups organized a meeting where they discussed their goals and aspirations. They surprisingly overlapped and so these women unanimously decided to work together toward their common goal and the two groups merged. They decided to temporarily call themselves "Women for the Advancement of a Multicultural Society" (WAMS). Several sororities on other college campuses were contacted with the intention of establishing a chapter at the University of Illinois campus. However, none of those had everything that was wanted by WAMS.

Finally, on April 20, 1993, after almost a year of searching for a sorority and much frustration, the women of WAMS made a decision to stop looking for other sororities and to commence their quest of founding their own. Three women from WAMS were designated pledge educators and helped the other twelve women's dream of founding a sorority become a reality. They went through a year-long pledging process during which they developed a strong bond of sisterhood.

The foundation of their sorority began with meetings where they discussed and voted upon its letters, colors, mascot, flower, and stone. On April 20, 1994, the members of WAMS were no longer just the women of WAMS; they were to be forever known as the founding mothers of Delta Xi Phi Multicultural Sorority. On February 6, 1998, Delta Xi Phi Sorority became an incorporated entity.

Founders
The following is a list of the fifteen original founders known as "Diamantes".

Amani Abukhdeir
Hanadi Abu-khdeir
Lynette E. Alvarado
Erma L. Alvarez
Yvonne E. Alvarez
Monica Arciga
Maria G. Barrera
Maria Teresa Botello
Aida Derat
Leticia Escamilla
Christine Lopez
Elia Morales
Carla Ortega
Alma Rivera
Nancy Tsao

National chapters
Over the years, DXP has grown with six chapters, seventeen associate chapters, one colony, and three interest groups. Delta Xi Phi's interest groups are known as "WAMS" – Women for the Advancement of a Multicultural Society. Active chapters are indicated in bold; inactive chapters are indicated in italic.

References

Notes 

National Multicultural Greek Council
Fraternal service organizations based in Chicago
Student organizations established in 1994
1994 establishments in Illinois